Eastern goldfinch may refer to:
 The American goldfinch, Spinus tristis, a finch from North America
 The eastern goldfinch, Carduelis caniceps, a finch from the Himalayas

Animal common name disambiguation pages